The Recall of MPs Act 2015 (c. 25) is an act of the Parliament of the United Kingdom that makes provision for constituents to be able to recall their Member of Parliament (MP) and call a by-election. It received royal assent on 26 March 2015 after being introduced on 11 September 2014.

Unlike recall procedures in some other countries, the act does not allow constituents to initiate proceedings. Instead, proceedings are initiated only if an MP is found guilty of a wrongdoing that fulfils certain criteria. This petition is successful if at least one in ten voters in the constituency sign. Successful petitions force the recalled MP to vacate the seat, resulting in a by-election.

To date, three petitions have been made under the act; two of these received sufficient signatures to trigger a by-election.

Background
Before the passage of the act there were no mechanisms to recall Members of Parliament (MPs) in the UK. The Representation of the People Act 1981 disqualifies any person in jail for more than a year from being an MP, and thus automatically ejects an MP so jailed. MPs involved in scandals or convicted of lesser crimes could be expelled from their party and pressured to resign, but there was no mechanism to force the exit of an MP prior to a general election.

Supporters for introducing recall mechanisms included the pressure group 38 Degrees and the National Union of Students. The UK government gave a commitment in the 2010 Coalition Agreement to bring into force a power of recall. In the aftermath of the United Kingdom parliamentary expenses scandal, a number of MPs involved in wrongdoing resigned after related court cases—for example Eric Illsley, whose resignation caused the 2011 Barnsley Central by-election, and Denis MacShane, who caused the 2012 Rotherham by-election—were cases brought up by supporters of recall to allow voters to "sack" MPs who break the rules.

In June 2012, the Political and Constitutional Reform Select Committee published its reports into the recall process, listing twenty conclusions and recommendations which included the views that "a system of full recall may deter MPs from taking decisions that are unpopular locally or unpopular in the short-term, but which are in the long-term national interest",  note that expulsion would not prevent the person concerned standing in the resulting by-election. We recommend that the Government abandon its plans to introduce a power of recall", and "We have not seen enough evidence to support the suggestion that it will increase public confidence in politics, and fear that the restricted form of recall proposed could even reduce confidence by creating expectations that are not fulfilled."

In October 2014, during the final stage of debate on the bill in the Commons, opponents of the recall process pressed for assurances that voters could not begin recall petitions on the basis of views held or speeches made. Labour MP Geraint Davies said that misuse of the process would be an "intrinsic corruption of our democracy". Labour MP Frank Dobson opposed recall as a threat to "hinder social progress" by "vested interests".

Opponents of the process further worried that MPs "in fear" of being recalled would increase the number of "automatons and lobby fodder" in the Commons.

Details of the act
Section 1 sets out the circumstances in which the Speaker of the House of Commons would trigger the recall process, namely:
A custodial prison sentence (including a suspended sentence);
Suspension from the House of at least 10 sitting days or 14 calendar days, following a report by the Committee on Standards;
A conviction for providing false or misleading expenses claims.

Sections 7–11 outline the procedure whereby the petition is forwarded by the electoral returning officer for the constituency to the MP's constituents for ratification, approval by 10 per cent of the registered electors triggering the loss of the MP's seat and a by-election.

Section 15 confirms that the seat becomes vacant if the petition is successful, if it has not already been vacated by disqualification or death, or otherwise.

Sections 16–22 make further provisions, including outlawing forecasts of the outcome of active recall petitions which are based on statements from or surveys of potential signatories.

Suspensions imposed by the Independent Expert Panel (established 2020) originally could not trigger recall. This oversight was addressed by an amendment to the Standing Orders of the House of Commons passed in October 2021 requiring the Committee on Standards to recommend suspension if asked to do so by the Panel.

Recall procedure 
Once one of the conditions outlined in the act is fulfilled, the Speaker informs the petitions officer of the constituency (in most cases this would be the returning officer or acting returning officer). The petitions officer is then required to make the practical arrangements for the petition so as to open the proceedings within ten working days after the Speaker's notification. This involves selecting up to ten signing locations where petitioners can sign in person, these function in a similar manner to election polling stations. As with votes in elections, voters are able to sign via post or proxy. Campaigning for or against recalling the MP is regulated by spending restrictions.

The petition remains open for six weeks. No ongoing tally is reported by the petitions officer and it is not revealed if the required threshold of 10 per cent of eligible voters threshold has been reached until the close of the petition period. During the petition period the MP remains in office. If the petition is successful the seat becomes vacant and by-election procedures begin. The recalled MP is permitted to stand in the by-election.

If the MP vacates the seat, or a general election is called, the recall is halted and the petition ends.

Recall petitions made under the act

A recall petition was not triggered in the case of Rob Roberts' six-week House suspension in May 2021 for sexual misconduct, as this case was judged by the Independent Expert Panel rather than the Committee on Standards. A Standing Order passed in October 2021 amended the Act to cover such cases, but a vote on applying this revision retrospectively to Roberts failed.

A recall petition could have been triggered in the case of Owen Paterson, who had been found by the Parliamentary Commissioner for Standards to have breached lobbying rules, but the House of Commons voted to reject a proposed 30-day suspension in November 2021 after the government whipped its MPs to vote against the Standards Committee's report. The Government subsequently made a u-turn and proposed a new vote, but Paterson chose to resign before such a vote occurred.

After Parliament directed the Committee of Privileges—which has the same MPs sitting upon it as the Committee on Standards—to investigate whether then-Prime Minister Boris Johnson had deliberately misled Parliament regarding his role in the Partygate scandal, the Speaker of the House, Lindsay Hoyle, confirmed that a qualifying suspension recommended by that Committee and approved by Parliament would trigger the recall process.

Notes

References

External links

United Kingdom Acts of Parliament 2015